Åmdals Verk is a small village in Tokke Municipality in Vestfold og Telemark county, Norway. The village is the site of a former copper mine. A branch of the Vest-Telemark Museum chronicles the history of the mines, and some of the tunnels are open to the public on guided tours during the summer season.

References

Tokke
Villages in Vestfold og Telemark
Copper mines